Mookerjee is a surname. Notable people with the surname include:

Harendra Coomar Mookerjee (1877–1956), the Governor of West Bengal from 1951 to 1956
Rajen Mookerjee, KCIE, KCVO, a pioneering Indian industrialist
Syama Prasad Mookerjee (1901–1953), minister in Pandit Jawaharlal Nehru's Cabinet as a Minister for Industry and Supply

See also
Mukherjee, one of several alternative spellings, for a full discussion of the history of the name

sv:Mookerjee